Hakim Bashi-ye Bala (also Romanized as Ḩakīm Bāshī-ye Bālā; also known as Ḩakīmbāshī ‘Olyā, Ḩakīm Bāshī-ye Ḩoseynābād, Neşf-e Mīān, Qal‘eh Hakīm Bāshi Bāla, and Qal‘eh-ye Ḩakīm Bāshī) is a village in Anarestan Rural District, Chenar Shahijan District, Kazerun County, Fars Province, Iran. At the 2006 census, its population was 1,959, in 429 families.

References 

Populated places in Chenar Shahijan County